Arnaut is an Occitan masculine given name, cognate with English Arnold, Catalan Arnau, French Arnaud, and Spanish Arnaldo. It may refer to:
Arnaut Catalan (fl. 1219–1253), troubadour
Arnaut de Cumenges (fl. 1218–1246), troubadour and soldier
Arnaut Daniel (fl. 1180–1200), troubadour
Arnaut Guilhem de Marsan (fl. 1160–1180), troubadour and viscount
Arnaut de Mareuil (fl. late 12th century), troubadour
Arnaut Plagues (fl. c. 1230–1245), troubadour
Arnaut de Tintinhac (fl. 12th-century), troubadour
Arnaut Vidal de Castelnou d'Ari (fl. 1305–1324), troubadour and author

English-language masculine given names
English masculine given names
French masculine given names